Hrišovce is a village and municipality in the Gelnica District in the Košice Region of eastern Slovakia. The municipality had, in 2019, a population of 303 inhabitants.

See also
 List of municipalities and towns in Slovakia

References

Genealogical resources

The records for genealogical research are available at the state archive "Statny Archiv in Levoca, Slovakia"

 Roman Catholic church records (births/marriages/deaths): 1722-1918 (parish B)

External links
http://en.e-obce.sk/obec/hrisovce/hrisovce.html
Official homepage

Surnames of living people in Hrisovce

Villages and municipalities in Gelnica District